The 1877-78 Home Nations rugby union matches are a series of international friendlies held between the England, Ireland and Scotland national rugby union teams.

Results

Scoring system
The matches for this season were decided on goals scored. A goal was awarded for a successful conversion after a try, for a dropped goal or for a goal from mark. If a game was drawn, any unconverted tries were tallied to give a winner. If there was still no clear winner, the match was declared a draw.

The matches

England vs. Scotland

England: HE Kayll, AW Pearson, A.N. Hornby, L Stokes, WAD Evanson, PLA Price, Edward Kewley capt., FR Adams, FD Fowler, Murray Marshall, JM Biggs, GF Vernon, GT Thomson, Edward Temple Gurdon, H Fowler

Scotland: Bill Maclagan, Malcolm Cross, Ninian Finlay, John Alexander Neilson, James Campbell, Stewart Henry Smith, DR Irvine, G Macleod, Louis Auldjo, RW Irvine capt., AG Petrie, JHS Graham, Henry Melville Napier, NT Brewis, JE Junor

Ireland vs. England

Ireland: RB Walkington capt., RN Maiter, FW Kidd, GL Fagan, TG Gordon, EWD Crocker, WD Moore, F Schute, HW Murray, W Finlay, JA MacDonald, HG Edwards, HC Kelly, RW Hughes, W Griffiths

England: WJ Penny, AW Pearson, A.N. Hornby, HJ Enthoven, AH Jackson, JL Bell, HP Gardner, CL Verelst, T Blatherwick, Murray Marshall capt., A Budd, GF Vernon, WH Hunt, EF Dawson, Edward Beadon Turner

Bibliography

References

History of rugby union matches between England and Scotland
History of rugby union matches between England and Ireland
England national rugby union team matches
Scotland national rugby union team matches
Ireland national rugby union team matches
1877–78 in British rugby union
1878 in English sport
1878 in Scottish sport
rugby union